Hillsboro is an unincorporated community and census-designated place (CDP) in Scott County, Mississippi, United States. Its population was 1,130 as of the 2010 census. Hillsboro has a post office with ZIP code 39087.

Demographics

2020 census

As of the 2020 United States census, there were 1,072 people, 357 households, and 213 families residing in the CDP.

Education
Most of Hillsboro is in the Forest Municipal School District while a portion is in the Scott County School District.

Notes

Census-designated places in Scott County, Mississippi
Unincorporated communities in Mississippi
Census-designated places in Mississippi
Unincorporated communities in Scott County, Mississippi